Anita Bhimsingh Bhadel (born 1972) is an Indian politician and former Minister of Child and Woman Welfare in the government of Rajasthan. She is a member of the Rajasthan Legislative Assembly representing the Ajmer South Vidhan Sabha constituency of Rajasthan and a Bharatiya Janata Party politician. Mrs. Bhadel belong to the Koli caste of Rajasthan.

History
Anita Bhadel started her political career as a corporator in Ajmer in 1997 and within one year she became a Chairman of Ajmer Municipal Corporation. The next year she ran for the MLA in Ajmer East for the Bhartiya Janta Party, where she won by a margin of 10,000 votes, defeating Congress ex-Minister Lalit Bhati. In the 2008 MLA elections she again represented Ajmer South and won with a margin of 23,000 votes, but as BJP collapsed in Rajasthan she did not get a chance to be a minister. In the 2013 elections she again represented Ajmer South and won with a margin of 23,000 votes. This time she was awarded the place of Minister of Women and Child Development in Rajasthan. For her services in the department she was given the Nari Shakti Award 2017 by the President of India.

References 

Living people
Bharatiya Janata Party politicians from Rajasthan
Rajasthan MLAs 2013–2018
1972 births
Rajasthan MLAs 2018–2023